The Sokopf Falke is an Austrian paramotor that was designed by Uli Sokopf and produced by his company Sokopf of Innsbruck for powered paragliding. Now out of production, when it was available the aircraft was supplied complete and ready-to-fly.

Design and development
The aircraft was designed to comply with the US FAR 103 Ultralight Vehicles rules as well as European regulations. It features a paraglider-style wing, single-place or two-place-in-tandem accommodation and a single  Simonini Racing engine in pusher configuration reduction drive and a  diameter two-bladed, wooden propeller. The aircraft is built from a combination of bolted aluminium and 4130 steel tubing.

The Falke series was designed in the late 1990s with an emphasis on maximum thrust, rather than lightness. In an emergency the entire engine unit can be jettisoned.

As is the case with all paramotors, take-off and landing is accomplished by foot. Inflight steering is accomplished via handles that actuate the canopy brakes, creating roll and yaw.

Variants
Falke 2001
Model with a  Simonini Racing engine in pusher configuration with a 2.8:1 ratio reduction drive and a  diameter two-bladed wooden propeller.
Falke 03
Model with a  Simonini Racing engine in pusher configuration with a 2.42:1 ratio reduction drive and a  diameter two-bladed wooden propeller.

Specifications (Sokopf Falke 03)

References

Falke
1990s Austrian ultralight aircraft
Single-engined pusher aircraft
Paramotors